The 1933 Georgia Bulldogs football team represented the Georgia Bulldogs of the University of Georgia during the 1933 college football season. The Bulldogs completed the season with an 8–2 record. This was the first year of the Southeastern Conference (SEC).

Schedule

References

Georgia
Georgia Bulldogs football seasons
Georgia Bulldogs football